Sulayman ibn Muhammad ibn Hud al-Judhami, known by the regnal name al-Mustaʿin bi-Illah, was the first member of the Banu Hud family to rule the medieval taifa of Zaragoza, today a province in Spain. He ruled from 1039 (when he seized control of the city from the Banu Tujib) to 1046.

References

Banu Hud
Emirs of Zaragoza
11th-century rulers in Al-Andalus
1040s deaths
11th-century Arabs